"Quiver" is a ten-issue Green Arrow story arc written by Kevin Smith with art by Phil Hester that ran between April 2001 until the January of 2002. Published by DC Comics, the arc appeared in Green Arrow (vol. 3) #1-10 and was edited by Bob Schreck.

Plot summary

Having learned of Green Arrow's recent death during his return to Earth in the Final Night crisis, Hal Jordan revives Green Arrow from the dead, but the resurrected Green Arrow only possesses Oliver's memories up to the events prior to The Longbow Hunters, with an examination of his body revealing that he is missing several old scars sustained after that point. As the resurrected Ollie Queen tries to figure out his place in this new world (aided by the seemingly benevolent Stanley Dover, who took him in after he rescued Stanley from a mugging), he interacts with important people from his past, including Black Canary, the Justice League, Batman, and Roy Harper. He also takes on a ward, Mia Dearden, who becomes the new Speedy. As it turns out, Green Arrow was revived in body but not soul; since Oliver Queen himself preferred to remain in Heaven but recognized his friend's need to bring something back, the body's memories stopping when they do because Queen felt that things went wrong for him after he took a life when he killed a rapist. This results in him being attacked by Etrigan the Demon due to his status as a 'hollow' (a soulless being who can be used by some demons to gain access to Earth). Jordan, as the Spectre, transports Ollie out of Etrigan's reach and brings him to Heaven to talk with his soul. However, when the soul prefers to remain in Heaven, Ollie is sent back and captured by Dover, really a practitioner of the black arts who intends to transfer his soul into Oliver's body (a spell only possible due to Oliver's lack of a soul) and then use the JLA Watcher's monitoring systems to track down the Beast With No Name, a benevolent demon he summoned to grant himself immortality.

As Connor Hawke fights to save his father - the house being protected by a blood seal that prevents anyone from entering it if they are not related to an inhabitant - Ollie makes contact with his soul while Dover attempts the ritual to take control of Ollie's body, convincing the soul to leave Heaven and rejoin with his body to save their son. With the two Green Arrows having fought off Dover's demons, they are saved by the Beast With No Name, which returned them to the Hell dimension they were summoned from. The Beast subsequently devours Dover, who leaves Ollie and Connor in Dover's house, revealing that Dover left everything to Ollie — back when he believed he would be inheriting Oliver's body — and encouraging Oliver to use Dover's house and resources to fight evil in Star City.

Reception
"Quiver" received mostly positive reviews. Entertainment Weekly'''s Ken Tucker wrote: "The first issue pins you to the wall with artist Phil Hester's elegantly elongated figures and unpredictably shaped panels, while Smith succeeds in boiling down the Arrow mythos". Along with "Guardian Devil", "Quiver" helped to establish Kevin Smith as one of the most popular writers in comics.

"Quiver" was named as one of 2003's Best Books for Young Adults by the American Library Association's Young Adult Library Service.

Collected editions
Quiver was collected into a hardcover and trade paperback editions, Green Arrow: Quiver''.

See also
Comic book death

References

External links

Quiver at DC Database

Comics by Kevin Smith
Green Arrow
Black Canary